Varig Flight 837 was a flight from Fiumicino Airport, Rome, Italy to Roberts International Airport, Monrovia, Liberia, originating in Beirut, Lebanon. On 5 March 1967, due to pilot error, the flight crashed during approach to Runway 04 of Roberts International Airport. Of the 71 passengers and 19 crew on board, 50 passengers and the flight engineer perished. In addition, 5 people on the ground were also killed. The aircraft caught fire and was written off. This is the worst aviation accident in Liberia to this day.

Investigators determined the probable cause of the crash to be "The failure of the pilot-in-command to arrest in time the fast descent at a low altitude upon which he had erroneously decided, instead of executing a missed approach when he found himself too high over the locator beacon."

References

External links

Aviation accidents and incidents in Liberia
837
1967 in Liberia
Aviation accidents and incidents in 1967
Accidents and incidents involving the Douglas DC-8
Airliner accidents and incidents caused by pilot error
March 1967 events in Africa